VA-9 has the following meanings:
Attack Squadron 9 (U.S. Navy)
State Route 9 (Virginia)
Virginia's 9th congressional district